Rick Holdcroft is a member of the Nebraska Legislature for District 36 from Bellevue, Nebraska. He was elected to the Nebraska Legislature on November 8, 2022. Holdcroft is the first senator to serve District 36 since it was relocated to Sarpy County after the Nebraska Legislature's 2021 redistricting. Holdcroft served in the United States Navy for 28 years.

Political Positions
Holdcroft is pro-life and says he supports the decision of the United States Supreme Court in Dobbs v. Jackson Women's Health Organization.

Electoral history

References

Republican Party Nebraska state senators
21st-century American politicians
Living people
1954 births